Clarence Correctional Centre is a minimum- and maximum-security prison for men and women located near Grafton, New South Wales, Australia. It holds inmates sentenced under State or Australian criminal law. It has 1,700 beds, making it the largest prison in Australia. It's operated by Serco. The prison opened on 25 July 2020. The project was delivered by the NSW Government in partnership with the NorthernPathways consortium consisting of John Holland, Serco, John Laing and Macquarie Capital. Pedavoli Architects designed and delivered the Clarence Correctional Centre in Grafton. It is located 20 kilometres away from the old Grafton Correctional Centre, which it replaced.

See also 

 List of prisons in Australia

References 

Prisons in New South Wales
2020 establishments in Australia